Sankt Marein-Feistritz  is a municipality since 2015 in the Murtal District of Styria, Austria.

The municipality, Sankt Marein-Feistritz, was created as part of the Styria municipal structural reform,
at the end of 2014, by merging the former towns Sankt Marein bei Knittelfeld and Feistritz bei Knittelfeld.

Geography

Municipality arrangement 
The municipality territory includes the following 15 sections (populations as of 1 January 2015):

 Altendorf (211)
 Feistritz bei Knittelfeld (582)
 Feistritzgraben (1)
 Fentsch (130)
 Fressenberg (45)
 Greith (129)
 Hof (115)
 Kniepaß (8)
 Laas (64)
 Mitterfeld (14)
 Moos (6)
 Prankh (123)
 Sankt Marein bei Knittelfeld (299)
 Sankt Martha (190)
 Wasserleith (109)

The municipality consists of the six
Katastralgemeinden (areas as of 2015):
 Feistritz
 Fressenberg
 Greuth
 Prank
 St. Marein
 Wasserleith

Tourism 
The municipality formed, together with Lobmingtal, Kobenz, Seckau, Spielberg, Gaal and Zeltweg, "Tourismus am Spielberg". The base is in the town Spielberg.

Culture and sights

References

External links 
 Homepage des zuständigen Tourismusverbandes "Tourismus am Spielberg"

Cities and towns in Murtal District